Sailfin catfish, Janitor fish can refer to any of:
Pterygoplichthys multiradiatus - the orinoco sailfin catfish
Pterygoplichthys pardalis - the amazon sailfin catfish
Pterygoplichthys anisitsi - the snow king sailfin catfish
Glyptoperichthys gibbiceps (reclassified as Pterygoplichthys gibbiceps) - sailfin plec (L164) also known as leopard plec or spotted sailfin catfish